The Shorland armoured car was a vehicle built by Short Brothers and Harland for the Royal Ulster Constabulary.

Shorland may also refer to

 Shorland S600, a later version of the Shorland armoured car
 Shorland (album), by Moke, 2007
 Anne Gertrude Shorland, New Zealand lawyer, and judge 1987–2002
 Brian Shorland (1909–1999), New Zealand organic chemist
Shorland Medal, a science research award named after Brian Shorland
 16599 Shorland, a minor planet

See also 
 
 Shortland (disambiguation)